A Foolish Girl (Czech: Bláhové devce) is a 1938 Czech romance film directed by Václav Binovec and starring Hana Vítová, Vladimír Borský and Zita Kabátová.

The film's sets were designed by the art director Alois Mecera.

Cast

References

External links

1930s romance films
Czechoslovak romance films
Films directed by Václav Binovec
1930s Czech-language films
1930s Czech films